The 2010 AFC U-16 Championship was an international under-16 age group football tournament held in Uzbekistan from 24 October until 7 November 2010. The sixteen national teams involved in the tournament were required to register a squad of maximum 23 players; only players in these squads were eligible to take part in the tournament.

The age listed for each player is on 24 October 2010, the first day of the tournament. The nationality for each club reflects the national association (not the league) to which the club is affiliated. A flag is included for coaches that are of a different nationality than their own national team. Players in boldface have been capped at full international level at some point in their career.

Group A

Uzbekistan
Head coach: Aleksey Evstafeev

The final squad was announced on 20 October 2010.

Tajikistan
Head coach: Zoir Babaev

Jordan
Head coach:  Jonathan Hill

The final squad was announced on 19 October 2010.

Indonesia
Head coach: Mundari Karya

Group B

Iran
Head coach: Akbar Mohammadi

The final squad was announced on 18 October 2010.

Syria
Head coach: Mohamad Joumaa

North Korea
Head coach: Ri Song-ho

Oman
Head coach:  Boubacar Sarr

Group C

Japan
Head coach: Hirofumi Yoshitake

The final squad was announced on 19 October 2010.

Australia
Head coach: Gary van Egmond

The final squad was announced on 19 October 2010.

Timor Leste
Head coach: Agostinho Mesquita

Vietnam
Head coach: Hoàng Văn Phúc

Group D

United Arab Emirates
Head coach: Bader Ahmed Saleh

Iraq
Head coach: Atheer Isam

China
Head coach: Cao Xiandong

Kuwait
Head coach: Anwar Boutaiban

References

External links
, the-AFC.com

Squads
AFC U-16 Championship squads